The women's high jump event at the 2002 Commonwealth Games was held on 30 July.

Results

References
Official results
Results at BBC

High
2002
2002 in women's athletics